Arthur or Art Hancock may refer to:

Arthur B. Hancock (1875–1957), American horse breeder
Art Hancock (born 1905), American baseball player
Arthur B. Hancock Jr. (1910–1972), American horse breeder
Arthur B. Hancock III (born 1943), American horse breeder